Billy Joel in Concert is a current concert tour by the American singer-songwriter Billy Joel. After several concerts beforehand, in the fall of 2013, the concert tour began in Sunrise, Florida, and is ongoing, scheduled to continue into at least November 10, 2023 in Minneapolis,
Minnesota.

Background
After completing the 2010 Face to Face Tour with Elton John, Joel left the stage and did not return until 2013. He played several concerts, including Sydney in Australia as well as four concerts in the United Kingdom.

The tour began in Sunrise, Florida, with two concerts at the BB&T Center in January 2014.

Madison Square Garden
The tour created a concert residency at Madison Square Garden in New York City. Joel committed to playing one show a month at Madison Square Garden as long as there is a demand for tickets.  His first monthly show at the Garden was January 27, 2014. At his thirteenth consecutive monthly performance (January 9, 2015), Joel broke his 2006 record for the most consecutive sold-out shows at the venue. On July 1, 2015, Joel set the record for most shows at the Garden by a single artist; his 65th all-time show broke the record previously held by Elton John and the Grateful Dead. His 74th consecutive monthly (120th all-time) MSG performance was slated for March 2020, but had to be postponed due to COVID-19. The long-running residency has included various guest performers over the years.

Nassau Veterans Memorial Coliseum
Joel performed the last concert at Long Island's Nassau Coliseum on August 4, 2015, prior to the venue's extensive renovation. The venue re-opened its doors on April 5, 2017, with Joel being the arena's first post-renovation event.

Set list
This setlist was performed at the January 11, 2019, concert held at Amway Center in Orlando. It does not represent all shows throughout the tour.

"Big Shot"
"Miami 2017 (Seen the Lights Go Out on Broadway)"
"Summer, Highland Falls"
"The Entertainer"
"All for Leyna"
"Zanzibar"
"Vienna"
"Movin' Out (Anthony's Song)"
"New York State of Mind"
"Don't Ask Me Why"
"And So It Goes"
"Allentown"
"All About Soul"
"She's Always a Woman"
"My Life"
"The River of Dreams"
"Only the Good Die Young"
"Nessun dorma"
"Scenes from an Italian Restaurant"
"Piano Man"
Encore
"We Didn't Start the Fire"
"Uptown Girl"
"It's Still Rock and Roll to Me"
"You May Be Right"

Tour dates

Grossing
2014: $72.2 million from 35 shows
2015: $69.9 million from 29 shows
2016: $76.6 million from 28 shows
2017: $82.3 million from 28 shows
2018: $70.3 million from 23 shows
2019: $76.9 million from 22 shows
2020: $14.8 million from 6 shows
2021: $17.4 million from 4 shows

Total available grossing: $480 million from 175 shows.

See also
List of highest-grossing concert tours

Notes

References

Billy Joel concert tours
Concert tours postponed due to the COVID-19 pandemic
2014 concert tours
2015 concert tours
2016 concert tours
2017 concert tours
2018 concert tours
2019 concert tours
2020 concert tours
2021 concert tours
2022 concert tours
2023 concert tours